Henry Roberts may refer to:

Henry Roberts (fl. 1606), English writer
Henry Roberts (Royal Navy officer) (1756–1796), served with Captain Cook
Henry Roberts (architect) (1803–1876), architect of Fish Hall
Henry Roberts (cricketer) (1888–1963), English first class cricketer
Henry Roberts (engraver), English engraver in the 18th-century
Henry Roberts (governor) (1853–1929), American politician and Governor of Connecticut
Henry Roberts (rugby union) (1862–1949), New Zealand rugby player
Henry B. Roberts, American politician
Henry Gee Roberts (1800–1860), major general and political agent in India
Harry R. Roberts (Henry Richard Roberts, died 1924), Australian stage actor
Harry Roberts (footballer, born 1907) (Henry Roberts, 1907–1984), English footballer
B. H. Roberts (1857–1933), English-born Mormon leader
Ed Roberts (computer engineer) (Henry Edward Roberts, 1941–2010), American computer pioneer

See also
Harry Roberts (disambiguation)